Black Sun is the fourth album by South Korean hip-hop duo Leessang. The album was released on May 17, 2007. The album contains 13 songs.

Track listing

References

2007 albums
Korean-language albums
Leessang albums